is a Japanese manga series written and illustrated by Motoyuki Tanaka. It was serialized in Shogakukan's Weekly Shōnen Sunday from January 2005 to April 2010, with its chapters collected in twenty-six tankōbon volumes. In 2008, the manga won the 32nd Kodansha Manga Award for the shōnen category.

Story
Six years ago following a crushing defeat, a group of friends promise that they will one day take their friend Suzuo to the Koshien. Now in their first year of high school, the friends have reunited behind the pitcher Kitarō Kitaōji to keep their promise. With Suzuo as their manager and Kitarō's signature left-handed, underhand "Submarine Pitch", they may just go all the way.

Publication
Saikyō! Toritsu Aoizaka Kōkō Yakyūbu is written and illustrated by Motoyuki Tanaka. It was serialized in Shogakukan Weekly Shōnen Sunday from January 4, 2005 to April 14, 2010. Shogakukan collected its chapters in twenty-six tankōbon volumes, released from April 18, 2005 to June 18, 2010.

Volume list

Reception
In 2008, the manga won the 32nd Kodansha Manga Award for the shōnen category.

See also
Be Blues! - Ao ni Nare, another manga series by the same author

References

External links

2005 manga
Baseball in anime and manga
Shogakukan manga
Shōnen manga
Winner of Kodansha Manga Award (Shōnen)